The Babka is a river in Perm Krai, Russia, a left tributary of the Sylva which in turn is a tributary of the Chusovaya. It flows through Kungursky and Permsky districts. Main tributaries: Tatarka, Yumysh, Platoshinka, Kushtanka, Byrma, Bizyarka, Sukhobizyarka, Yelymovka, Solyanka and Kotlovka.

References

External links 
Encyclopedia of Perm Krai

Rivers of Perm Krai